Bhatt Mathura was a Brahmin bard in the court of Guru Arjan, whose 14 hymns are present in Guru Granth Sahib, the holy book of Sikhs. The title Bhatt is given to learned Brahmins and they were brother of Bhatt Kirat.

References

Sikh Bhagats